Druid Lake is a kettle lake located in the town of Erin, Wisconsin, Washington County, Wisconsin near Hartford, Wisconsin. Druid Lake is a natural glacial-formed lake. Druid Lake is surrounded by rugged mixed woods and glacial drumlins in the Southern Savannah Region of southeastern Wisconsin's Kettle Moraine area about 25 miles northwest of Milwaukee.

Fish species present
Bluegill
Largemouth bass
Northern pike
Walleye
Yellow perch
Yellow bass
White bass
Warmouth
Pumpkinseed
Black crappie
Carp
Yellow bullhead
Rock bass

Usage
Launch fee:   Yes
Ramp type:   Concrete
Number of ramps:   1
Trailer parking spots:   4-5

Organizations associated with this lake
Druid Lake P & R District
Druid Lake Property Owners Association

Notes and references

External links
Map of Druid Lake from the Wisconsin Department of Natural Resources

Lakes of Washington County, Wisconsin
Tourist attractions in Washington County, Wisconsin
Kettle lakes in the United States

eo:Granda Verda Lago